Christopher Hamlet Thompson (born 9 March 1948) is an English singer and guitarist known both for his work with Manfred Mann's Earth Band, specifically for his lead vocal on the classic hit "Blinded By the Light" and for his solo accomplishments.

Biography 
Thompson was born in Ashford, Kent, England, but raised in New Zealand. His early musical experiences were whilst still at school with the band The Paragons that played at weekly church youth club dances. Later, as his talent became clear, the band was reformed as Dynasty with other musicians and achieved much local success on the New Zealand music scene. Thompson's last band in New Zealand was Mandrake, formed with university friends who played the Friday and Saturday night dances in and around Hamilton City.

He went to Australia before returning to England in 1973 to pursue a musical career, eventually joining Manfred Mann's Earth Band in 1976.

In 1978, he was featured in Jeff Wayne's Musical Version of The War of the Worlds, providing lead vocals for the song "Thunder Child".

After several years with Manfred Mann's Earth Band, Thompson left in 1979 and formed the Los Angeles-based outfit Night, which enjoyed two hits during its lifetime. One of them, "If You Remember Me," the unused theme song for Franco Zeffirelli's remake of The Champ, was initially credited solely to Thompson; later pressings of the single were credited to "Chris Thompson and Night."  (But this source gives lyric credit to Carole Bayer Sager for "If You Remember Me," and the music credit to Marvin Hamlisch.) The song reached #17 on the U.S. Billboard Hot 100 and #7 Adult Contemporary. It was a very minor hit in Canada (#91). After the band broke up in 1982, he rejoined the Earth Band.

In 1980, he co-wrote and sang backing vocals on the track "No Stoppin' Us Now" with Patrick Simmons and Michael McDonald, on the Doobie Brothers' album One Step Closer. In 1983 he contributed vocals to Simmons' solo album Arcade as well as co-writing several of the tracks.

In 1981, Thompson released his debut album, Out of the Night. This was followed by five more albums, most recently Won't Lie Down in 2001.

In 1984, while functional lead singer for the re-formed Manfred Mann's Earth Band, Thompson lent lead vocals to "Runner," which slowly climbed to become a USA and UK top 30 hit, propelled by then-hot MTV airplay.

In 1986, Thompson was one of the four co-writers of the hit song "You're the Voice" - the others being Andy Qunta of Australian new wave outfit Icehouse, erstwhile Procol Harum lyricist Keith Reid and Maggie Ryder. He hoped to record the song in London but was turned down by record companies there who stated the song was "not commercial". He sent a demo to John Farnham, who had recently come off a five-year stint fronting the Little River Band. Farnham liked the song and agreed to record it for his forthcoming album, Whispering Jack. Farnham's release of "You're the Voice" was a worldwide hit, reaching top ten positions in many countries across the world.

Also in 1986, Thompson sang vocals on a solo album by ex-Genesis guitarist Steve Hackett. The album featured performances by artists such as Brian May (Queen), Pete Trewavas (Marillion), Ian Mosley (also from Marillion), and Bonnie Tyler. However, the album, entitled Feedback 86, was not released until 2002.

In spite of his already busy schedule in 1986, Thompson still found the time to return to Manfred Mann for their new album, Criminal Tango, in addition to putting out some solo material.  He recorded the song "It's Not Over" for the soundtrack to the film Playing for Keeps, and this track was also featured (with a slightly longer fade-out) on his new solo album, High Cost of Living, released later the same year. The following year, "It's Not Over" would be re-recorded by Starship, becoming a top-ten hit for the group.

In 1989, Thompson recorded the single "The Challenge (Face It)" as the official theme song for the 1989 Wimbledon Tennis Championships. He co-wrote the song with Harold Faltermeyer. A year later, in 1990, Thompson worked again with Faltermeyer in writing the 1990 song for Wimbledon, Hold the Dream by Franzisca.

Also in 1990, Thompson recorded the single "This Is The Moment" as the official theme song for the 1990 Commonwealth Games in Auckland.

In 1992, Thompson performed at the Freddie Mercury Tribute Concert as a backing musician, harmonising with respected backing vocalists Maggie Ryder and Miriam Stockley. He also joined The Brian May Band for their South American tour the same year.

In 1995, Thompson performed "You're The Voice" in the Netherlands at the World Liberty Concert as the grand finale of the event. He also sang a studio version of it on the Alan Parsons The Very Best Live album (1995).

In 2006 and 2007, he joined Jeff Wayne for a second time to tour as The Voice of Humanity in the live version of Jeff Wayne's Musical Version of The War of the Worlds. According to the special features of the DVD Jeff Wayne's Musical Version of The War of the Worlds - Live on Stage, Thompson designed some artwork for the show.

Thompson has been featured on several albums by artists such as Alan Parsons, Jan Hammer, Steve Hackett, Bonnie Tyler, Mike Oldfield, and Sarah Brightman, as well as providing backing vocals for Brian May of Queen, during his first few solo concerts in South America in 1992.

Thompson has also been involved with the SAS Band (Spike's All Star Band) where he has performed numerous songs, especially from his repertoire with Manfred Mann's Earth Band.

Discography

With Manfred Mann's Earth Band
The Roaring Silence (1976)
Watch (1978)
Angel Station (1979)
Chance (1980)
Somewhere in Afrika (1982)
Budapest Live (1983)
Criminal Tango (1986)
Soft Vengeance (1996)
Mann Alive (1998)
2006 (2004)

SoloIf You Remember Me (1979)Out of the Night (1983)Radio Voices (1985)High Cost Of Living (1986)Beat Of Love (1989)The Challenge (Face It) (1989)Backtrack 1980-1994 (1999)Won't Lie Down (2001)Rediscovery (2004)Timeline (2005)Chris Thompson & Band - One Hot Night in the Cold (Live at the Private Music Club) (2006)Do Nothing Till You Hear from Me (2012)Toys & Dishes (2014)Jukebox-The Ultimate Collection 1975-2015 (2015)

Other collaborationsA Week at the Bridge E16 (1978) With Filthy McNasty (before becoming Night)Jeff Wayne's Musical Version of The War of the Worlds (1978) With Jeff WayneA Single Man (1978) with Elton JohnThe Garden of Love (1978) with Don RayNight (1979) with NightLong Distance (1981) with NightOne Step Closer (1980) with The Doobie BrothersWolf (1981) with Trevor RabinWaving Not Drowning (1982) with Rupert Hine
"All the Right Moves" (1983) with Jennifer WarnesPush and Shove (1985) with Chris Thompson With Hazel O'ConnorRunning the Endless Mile (1986) with John ParrSeeds of Life (1986) with Jan HammerWhispering Jack (1986) With John FarnhamRobbie Nevil (1986) with Robbie NevilA Place Like This (1988) with Robbie NevilLove Among the Cannibals (1989) with StarshipTabaluga and the Magic Jadestone (1988) with Peter MaffayTake What You Need (1989) with Robin TrowerAfter the War (1989) with Gary MooreEarth Moving (1989) with Mike OldfieldTry Anything Once (1993) with Alan ParsonsAlan Parsons Live/The Very Best Live (1994/95) with Alan ParsonsExcalibur featuring Michael Ernst (2003) with Alan ParsonsFree Spirit (1996) with Bonnie TylerSAS Band (1997) with SAS BandThe Show (2001) with SAS BandMetallic Blue (1998) with Steelhouse LaneSlaves of New World (1999) with Steelhouse LaneFeedback 86 (2000) with Steve HackettRedhanded (2001) with Mads EriksenRediscovery (2004) With Mads EriksenBerlin Live & The Aschaffenburg Remains Live at the Colos-Saal (2012) with Mads EriksenSoulmates (2002) with Leslie MándokiJazz Cuts (2003) with Leslie MándokiAllstars, "Legends of Rock" (2004) with Leslie MándokiBudaBest (2013) with Leslie MándokiPolarity (2003) with LavaExcalibur (2003) with Michael ErnstLive (2005) with Siggi Schwarz & The Rock LegendsWoodstock (2005) with Siggi Schwarz & The Rock LegendsSoul Classics (2007) with Siggi Schwarz & The Rock LegendsOn My Side (2006) with Rudi ButtasHow Can Heaven Love Me (1995) with Sarah BrightmanI Will Be with You (Where the Lost Ones Go) (Pokémon 10: The Rise of Darkrai) (2007) with Sarah BrightmanThe Phantom of the Opera (Symphony: Live in Vienna) (2008) with Sarah BrightmanMitten Ins Herz (2008) with NicoleMake Me an Offer'' (2009) with Lindy Bingham

References

External links

 Chris Thompson's official site
 [ Chris Thompson page at the AMG website]
 August 2006 Chris Thompson interview at Classic Rock Revisited
 Live - a Week at the Bridge

1948 births
Living people
English male singers
Manfred Mann's Earth Band members
English rock guitarists
Rhythm guitarists
English songwriters
English male guitarists
People from Ashford, Kent
British male songwriters